Francisco Gutiérrez (died 1554) was a Roman Catholic prelate who served as Bishop of Ischia (1548–1554).

Biography
Francisco Gutiérrez was born in Spain.
On 24 Sep 1548, he was appointed during the papacy of Pope Paul III as Bishop of Ischia.
He served as Bishop of Ischia until his death in 1554.

References

External links and additional sources
 (for Chronology of Bishops) 
 (for Chronology of Bishops) 

16th-century Italian Roman Catholic bishops
Bishops appointed by Pope Paul III
1554 deaths